Killer's Kiss is a 1955 American crime film noir directed by Stanley Kubrick and written by Kubrick and Howard Sackler. It is the second feature film directed by Kubrick, following his 1953 debut feature Fear and Desire. The film stars Jamie Smith, Irene Kane, and Frank Silvera.

The film is about Davey Gordon (Jamie Smith), a 29-year-old middleweight New York boxer at the end of his career, and his relationship with his neighbor, taxi dancer Gloria Price (Irene Kane), and her violent employer Vincent Rapallo (Frank Silvera).

Plot
Davey Gordon is a middleweight boxer near the end of the line.  He's set to fight a top upcoming talent, with the winner in line for a title shot, but  that's not going to be Gordon. He sits alone in his meager apartment, one step up from a flop-house, brooding away the time till he meets Kid Rodriguez. Across the courtyard, Gloria, an attractive but world-weary taxi dancer, is getting ready for work. Each steals stealthy glances at the other, but their eyes never meet.  Walking out of the building, they run into each other but say nothing. Gloria is picked up by her boss Vincent.

As Davey is dropped by one knockdown after another, Gloria is fending off her boss Vincent's persistent pawing. That evening, after losing the fight and deep in a disturbing dream, Davey is awakened by a scream coming from Gloria's apartment. He rushes to the window and sees that Gloria is being attacked by Vincent. Before he can scamper across the rooftop to her room Vincent hears him coming and makes his getaway. Davey comforts Gloria and offers to stay with her as she drifts off to sleep, silently but curiously inspecting her keepsakes and hanging lingerie before leaving.

The couple reunites for breakfast at Gloria's, where they share their life stories.  With nothing holding either to New York they decide to go to the Seattle ranch of Davey's aunt and uncle, a caring pair and only surviving kin who have repeatedly invited him to return.

While Gloria quits the dance hall and seeks her final pay, Davey meets with his manager to collect his share of the fight purse.  When Vincent hears Gloria is leaving, he tries to wheedle her plans from her.  She stonewalls him and is told to get out.  Waiting for Davey, she stands outside the entrance next to a man she doesn't know.  Mistaking the man for Davey, Vincent sends two goons to rough him up. They go too far and kill the man, who was Davey's manager.

Vincent kidnaps Gloria and holds her in a rundown hideout in a brick wasteland. Police suspect Davey of the murder and search his room. Davey tries to rescue Gloria but he is captured. He escapes, leading to a chase and confrontation in an abandoned warehouse full of mannequins. During a struggle Davey kills Vincent, then returns with the police to free Gloria. Davey is cleared of all charges. He buys a train ticket to the West Coast. He assumes Gloria will not join him, but at the last minute she arrives at the station and they kiss.

Cast

Background
This was Kubrick's second feature. Kubrick removed his first film Fear and Desire (1952) from circulation over his dissatisfaction with it. Kubrick directed that film between the ages of 26 and 27, and had to borrow $40,000 from his uncle Martin Perveler, who owned a chain of drug stores in Los Angeles. Killer's Kiss, originally titled Kiss Me, Kill Me, was also financed privately through family and friends, but because Fear and Desire did not recoup its production budget, Perveler did not invest this time. Most of the initial budget was covered by Morris Bousel, a Bronx pharmacist who was rewarded with a co-producer credit.

Kubrick began to shoot the film with sound recorded on location, as was common practice in Hollywood. However, frustrated by the intrusion of the microphone into his lighting scheme, Kubrick fired his sound-man and decided to post-dub the entire film as he had with his first film. The film is notable for its location shots in the old Penn Station, which was demolished in 1963, as well as Times Square, and the run-down streets of both the Brooklyn waterfront and of Hell's Hundred Acresthe nickname at the time for Manhattan's SoHo neighborhood.

Ballerina Ruth Sobotka, Kubrick's wife at the time, was the art director for this film, as well as for Kubrick's next, The Killing. She is also featured in a long dance solo, playing the role of Iris. Then-model and future writer and television journalist Chris Chase, using the stage name Irene Kane, made her acting debut as the female lead.

Against Kubrick's wishes, United Artists required the film be recut with a happy ending.
United Artists paid $100,000 for the film and also agreed to provide $100,000 for Kubrick's next, The Killing.

The film features the song "Once", written by Norman Gimbel and Arden Clar.  It is one of Gimbel's earliest contributions to a film, although his lyrics do not actually appear in the final version.

Reception

Critical response

When released, the staff at Variety magazine gave the film a mixed review, and wrote:

In a 2003 review for The New York Times, Janet Maslin wrote:

Awards
Wins
 Locarno International Film Festival: Prize, Best Director, Stanley Kubrick; 1959.

Adaptation
In 1983 Matthew Chapman directed Strangers Kiss, a film that portrayed the making of Killer's Kiss.

Home media

The film was released on DVD and Blu-ray as a special feature of The Criterion Collection's release of Kubrick's The Killing. A 4K UHD release was announced on January 2, 2022 by Kino Lorber.

References

External links
 
 
 
 
 
 Killer's Kiss informational site and DVD review at DVD Beaver (includes images)

1955 films
1955 crime drama films
American black-and-white films
American boxing films
Articles containing video clips
1950s English-language films
Film noir
Films directed by Stanley Kubrick
Golden Leopard winners
Mannequins in films
Films with screenplays by Stanley Kubrick
United Artists films
Films produced by Stanley Kubrick
Films scored by Gerald Fried
1950s American films
American crime drama films